Ernest Walter Brooks, FBA (30 August 1863 – 26 March 1955) was an English ancient historian and scholar of Syriac. The son of a priest, he was educated at Eton College (as a King's Scholar) and then at King's College, Cambridge, where he read classics and graduated in 1887. He then lived in London and Geneva (the latter from the late 1920s) as an independent scholar, before retiring to Hampshire in 1941. He became an expert in translating Syriac historical texts into English, gaining a leading reputation. His prolific output in this area was supplemented by research on Byzantine history and contributions to The Cambridge Medieval History (1911–23). Having received an honorary doctorate from the University of Louvain in 1927, he was elected a fellow of the British Academy in 1938 (though he resigned in 1941). His wife, Ellen, was a daughter of Major-General G. B. Mellersh.

References

Further reading 

 Ernest Walter Brooks, by Walter Stoneman (bromide print, May 1939). Preserved in the Photographs Collection, National Portrait Gallery, London (ref. no NPG x165656).

1863 births
1955 deaths
Syriacists
19th-century English historians
English translators
People educated at Eton College
Alumni of King's College, Cambridge
Fellows of the British Academy
20th-century English historians